The  is an electric multiple unit (EMU) train type which was formerly operated by Keio Corporation in Japan and first introduced in 1963. Built in batches by Nippon Sharyo, Tokyu Car Corp, and Hitachi, it was the recipient of the fourth Laurel Prize of the Japan Railfan Club.

A total of 155 vehicles were built between 1963 and 1969, formed as 23 four-car sets, 13 three-car sets, and 12 two-car sets.

Withdrawal and resale
Withdrawals started in 1987, with the last remaining non-air-conditioned two-car sets (5101 to 5112) operating until 21 March 1989. All units were withdrawn from Keio services by December 1996, and a number of units have since been converted for use on other lines throughout Japan, including the Iyotetsu 700 series.

References

Electric multiple units of Japan
5000 series
Train-related introductions in 1963
Nippon Sharyo multiple units
Tokyu Car multiple units
Hitachi multiple units
1500 V DC multiple units of Japan